Borka is a Slavic female given name. Notable people of this name include the following:

 Borka Grubor (b. 1960), Serbian politician
 Borka Jerman Blažič, Slovenian / Yugoslavian academic in information science and internet studies
 Borka Pavićević (1947–2019), Serbian / Yugoslavian dramaturge, newspaper columnist, and cultural activist
 Borka Vučić (1926–2009), Serbian politician

Serbian feminine given names